WIXL-LP (97.1 FM) is a radio station licensed to Madison, Wisconsin, United States, the station serves the Madison area. The station is currently owned by City Church, Inc. It broadcasts a Christian rock format. After many delays, the station went on air just ahead of an FCC deadline.

References

External links
 

IXL-LP
IXL-LP
Radio stations established in 2007
2007 establishments in Wisconsin